Ascalenia vanelloides is a moth in the family Cosmopterigidae. It is found in Turkey, the Palestinian Territories, Iraq, Iran, Saudi Arabia, Afghanistan, Turkmenistan and Uzbekistan.

The wingspan is 8–10.1 mm. Adults are on wing from April to August, probably in more than one generation per year.

The larvae possibly feed on Prosopis stephaniana.

References

Moths described in 1930
Ascalenia
Moths of Asia